Simon Theophilus Bailey (born August 26, 1968) is an American speaker, author, life coach, and entrepreneur. Bailey is the author of Shift Your Brilliance: Harness the Power of You, INC and Release Your Brilliance: The 4 Steps to Transforming Your Life and Revealing Your Genius to the World. Bailey was inducted into the National Speakers Association's CPAE Speaker Hall of Fame in 2015.

Early life
Bailey grew up in Buffalo, New York, where he attended Catholic school, until high school. He went to McKinley High School, a trade school in Buffalo, for 9th grade. After failing many of his classes and not making the football, basketball, or track and field teams, Bailey transferred to Bennett High School. At Bennett, he thrived. He found his passion for public speaking and became senior class president.

Bailey started college at Morehouse College in Atlanta. After a year, he could no longer afford to attend. He got a job in a hotel and started his career in hospitality. Ten years later, Bailey obtained an undergraduate degree.

Career
Bailey has a master's degree from Faith Christian University in Orlando, Florida, and a bachelor's degree from Life Christian University in Tampa. He is a graduate of Rollins College Executive Management Certificate program.

Bailey began his career in hospitality. He worked as the Sales Director of the Disney Institute for the Walt Disney Company. In 2003, Bailey founded Brilliance Institute, Inc. In 2010, Bailey served as the Vice President of University Relations for Oral Roberts University. Bailey is currently the CEO of Simon T. Bailey International.

In 2014, Bailey became a contributing writer for The Business Journals (a part of American City Business Journals family), where he writes a weekly article.  Bailey has also been a guest writer for online publications including Business Insider, Entrepreneur and Success.com. Bailey was the first African American Sales Director at Disney.

Speaking
Bailey has spoken at a variety of businesses, events, and conferences. HE keynoted the RIMS 2015 conference, alongside Arianna Huffington and Erik Wahl. Bailey's also been asked to speak for large companies such as IBM and Toyota. T. D. Jakes invited Bailey to present as MegaFest. The Women's Foodservice Forum hosted Bailey at four events in Los Angeles, Atlanta, Chicago, and Minneapolis.

In 2014, Bailey spoke with the National Association of Secondary School Principals and National School Board Association to help educators, parents, and students "recognize and embrace their own brilliance". Bailey was announced as a featured speaker at Microsoft's Worldwide Partner Conference in July 2014. Furthermore, Bailey completed an 8 city tour, the Be Collaborative Tour, with Omni Hotels & Resorts. In 2016, Bailey spoke at the ANCC National Magnet Conference.

Notably, Bailey has spoken at mainstream shows, Tedx and podcasts. His Goalcast video received 81 million views.

References

External links
 Simon T. Bailey website

1968 births
Business speakers
Life coaches
Living people
Morehouse College alumni
Oral Roberts University people
Rollins College alumni
University of Central Florida alumni
Writers from Buffalo, New York